The 2014 Milano–Torino was the 95th edition of the Milano–Torino single-day cycling race. The race was won by Italian cyclist Giampaolo Caruso.

Notable riders
Among the riders, Alberto Contador, winner of the 2012 Milano–Torino, competed. Other notable riders include Alejandro Valverde, Fabio Aru, and Ryder Hesjedal.

Results

References

External links

Milano–Torino
Milano–Torino
Milano–Torino